Alaska Daily is an American drama television series created by Tom McCarthy for ABC, starring Hilary Swank as a journalist seeking a fresh start in Anchorage, Alaska. It premiered on October 6, 2022.

Synopsis
Eileen (Hilary Swank) is a journalist from New York who moves to Alaska for a clean start and who looks for redemption both personally and professionally after joining a daily metro newspaper in Anchorage. In the City of Anchorage, she works with another colleague at the newspaper, Roz Friendly, to complete and release reports on the missing and murdered Indigenous women crisis in the state of Alaska.

Cast

Main
 Hilary Swank as Eileen Fitzgerald, a former high-profile investigator reporter in New York City  .
 Jeff Perry as Stanley Kornik, Eileen’s former boss and managing editor of the Daily Alaskan.
 Grace Dove as Roz Friendly, an Alaskan Native and star reporter for the Daily Alaskan who Stanley assigns to write with Eileen on her investigation. Having a family member who was a victim of an unsolved crime, Roz has a personal connection to the story and that drives her to keep searching for the truth.
 Meredith Holzman as Claire Muncy, veteran Daily Alaskan reporter who helps Eileen and Roz with the investigation. She deals with a personal struggle to find the balance between work and home life as a mother of two.
 Matt Malloy as Bob Young, Daily Alaskan senior reporter and acting news editor.
 Pablo Castelblanco as Gabriel Tovar, a chatty Daily Alaskan employee.
 Ami Park as Yuna Park, a Daily Alaskan cub reporter who quickly learns that reporting the truth isn’t always easy.
 Craig Frank as Austin Teague, a Daily Alaskan reporter who isn’t afraid to challenge his colleagues and represent the community.

Recurring
 Irene Bedard as Sylvie Nanmac
 Shane McRae as Aaron Pritchard, publisher of the Daily Alaskan
 Phillip Lewitski as Miles, a Daily Alaskan photographer
 Joe Tippett as Jamie
 Kourtney Bell as Karla
 Bill Dawes as Concerned Citizen

Guest
 James McDaniel as Defense Secretary Raymond Green

Episodes

Production
The pilot was written and directed by Tom McCarthy. The showrunner for the series is Peter Elkoff. Tom McCarthy's Slow Pony Productions, 20th Television, and Hilary Swank acted as producers. Filming for the series began on August 8, 2022, and concluded on January 5, 2023, in New Westminster, British Columbia.

The series' credits indicate the program was inspired by the 2019 Anchorage Daily News and ProPublica article series Lawless: Sexual Violence in Alaska, as well as subsequent related reporting by the project's lead reporter Kyle Hopkins. The Daily News agreed to work with the show's producers, resulting in Hopkins as well as ADN president Ryan Binkley being credited as executive producers on the TV series; however, Alaska Daily is not a dramatization of the specific events documented in the Lawless project.

Broadcast
Alaska Daily premiered on October 6, 2022 on ABC. The final five episodes of season 1 will air starting March 2, 2023.

Alaska Daily premiered on Disney+ (Star hub) in Hong Kong on November 9, 2022. It also premiered on Disney+ in Australia and New Zealand as part of the Star content hub on January 4, 2023 and weekly from February 8, 2023 in the UK and Ireland and Spain.

Reception

Critical response
The review aggregator website Rotten Tomatoes reported a 71% approval rating with an average rating of 6.6/10, based on 14 critic reviews. The website's critics consensus reads, "Alaska Daily awkwardly straddles the sensibilities of network TV and edgier streaming fare, but the core message about the importance of local journalism is fit to print." Metacritic, which uses a weighted average, assigned a score of 67 out of 100 based on 15 critics, indicating "generally favorable reviews".

Ratings

Accolades

References

External links

2020s American drama television series
2022 American television series debuts
American Broadcasting Company original programming
English-language television shows
Television series about journalism
Television series by 20th Century Fox Television
Television shows filmed in Burnaby
Television shows set in Alaska